Michelle Kaufmann is an American architect and designer. In 2002, Kaufmann founded Michelle Kaufmann Designs, which designed and built single-family and multi-family green homes using prefabricated modular technology. The firm was closed in May 2009 and Kaufmann started a new design firm, Michelle Kaufmann Studio. Kaufmann is also a co-founder of Flux.io, a company developing collaborative design software for the building design and construction industry.

Personal life

Kaufmann grew up in Iowa and received her undergraduate degree from Iowa State University and her Masters from Princeton University. Prior to founding Michelle Kaufmann Designs, Kaufmann was an Associate with Frank O. Gehry and had worked with him in Santa Monica. She also worked with Michael Graves.

Kaufmann relocated to Northern California, where she founded Michelle Kaufmann Designs. She has been a lecturer and keynote speaker for numerous events, and has taught at Iowa State University and Woodbury University.

Kaufmann currently lives with her husband and their two dogs in their Glidehouse in Marin County, California.

Projects 
The first project, titled Glidehouse, was designed by Kaufmann and her husband, Kevin Cullen, in 2004. A full-size replica of this home was built for the National Building Museum in Washington, D.C. from May 2006 through June 2007 as a part of the exhibit The Green House: New Directions in Sustainable Architecture and Design. The style is influenced by "Japanese homes, along with Eichler and Eames, as well as the rural farm buildings from" her "childhood in Iowa".

The first Sunset Breezehouse was designed by Michelle Kaufmann in collaboration with Sunset magazine in 2005.

The first MKLotus designed by Michelle Kaufmann was built in front of San Francisco's City Hall in 2007 as a part of West Coast Green conference on sustainable building. This design is among the smallest of the open-space homes offered by MK designs.  It includes a "front wrap-around deck and enclosed meditation garden" and is "Intended as a vacation or small stand-alone home". It uses the same sleek, geometric shapes as her other designs.

The MKSolaire was exhibited at the Museum of Science and Industry (Chicago) within a show titled "The Smart Home: Green and Wired", which was open from May 2008 to January 2009. The Solaire has been "redesigned to reflect the lifestyle of a couple looking to minimize home maintenance, maximize efficiency, and settle in to a space that not only is beautiful, but functional".

Awards and honors
In 2007 Kaufmann was named the "Henry Ford of green homes" by Sierra magazine, published by the Sierra Club.  Kaufmann’s work is widely published and her homes have been showcased in a number of museums, including the National Building Museum, the Vancouver Art Center, the Museum of Contemporary Art, Los Angeles, and most recently, in the "Smart Home: Green and Wired" exhibit at the Museum of Science and Industry (Chicago).

Other awards include:
 Top Firm Award 2008 from Residential Architect magazine.
 Innovations Award 2008 from Social Venture Network.
 Kaufmann was named "Advocate of the Year 2009" by the National Association of Home Builders.

Written works 
 Prefab Green (published by Gibbs Smith)

References

External links
 Kaufmann Studio official site
 Presenting at Cusp Conference 2010 (video)

American architects
Living people
Iowa State University alumni
Princeton University alumni
Iowa State University faculty
Woodbury University faculty
American women architects
Year of birth missing (living people)
American women academics
21st-century American women